Joanna of Castile was the monarch of Spain from 1516 until 1555.

Joanna of Castile, and variations Joan of Castile or Juana of Castile, may also refer to:
Joan, Countess of Ponthieu (died 1279), queen consort of Castile
Juana Manuel (died 1381), queen consort of Castile
Joan of Portugal (died 1475), queen consort of Castile
Joanna la Beltraneja (died 1530), infanta of Castile
Joan of Ponthieu, Dame of Epernon (before 1336–1376)